is a private high school in Nakano, Tokyo, Japan. The school was founded by Chiyo Horikoshi in 1923.

Horikoshi High School has been attended by many Japanese celebrities.

Notable alumni

References

External links
 
  

Educational institutions established in 1923
High schools in Tokyo
1923 establishments in Japan